Magizhini Manimaaran is an Indian folk and playback singer in the Tamil film industry who got a break as a playback singer in the film Kumki.

Personal life and early career
Born in Malaipuram in Kanchipuram district, Maghizhini's parents were farmers. She became a member of the Buddhar kalaikuzhu folk troupe, where she became a ‘parai’ drummer and met her husband Manimaaran.

Discography

Accolades

References

Living people
Tamil playback singers
Year of birth missing (living people)